The '69 Los Angeles Sessions is a re-issued album recorded in 1969 while Fela Kuti was living in Hollywood performing six nights a week at the Citadel de Haiti on Sunset Boulevard which at the time was being run by Bernie Hamilton.

Track listing

KOOLA LOBITOS 64-68 (previously unreleased)
 "Highlife Time" - 5:22
 "Omuti Tide" - 3:50
 "Ololufe Mi" - 5:16
 "Wadele Wa Rohin"  4:05
 "Laise Lairo" - 4:11
 "Wayo" (1st version) - 4:41
The '69 L.A. SESSIONS
 "My Lady Frustration" - 8:06	
 "Viva Nigeria" - 3:45
 "Obe (Stew)" - 3:11	
 "Ako" - 2:40
 "Witchcraft" - 5:25
 "Wayo (Version 2)" - 3:27
 "Lover" - 6:08
 "Funky Horn"	4:42
 "Eko Ile" - 4:12
 "This Is Sad" - 4:23

References

Fela Kuti albums
Wrasse Records albums
1969 albums